The Leopold Canal ( or Leopoldvaart) is a canal in northern Belgium. Construction occurred between 1847 and 1850 after the Belgian government granted permission in 1846. It runs about  westward from Boekhoute to Heist-aan-Zee just south of the Dutch border. The canal was proposed by Canon , local member of the Belgian National Congress, to prevent the Dutch from blocking the discharge of water and inundating the Meetjesland after Belgium's independence from the Netherlands.

This canal was a major line of German resistance during the Battle of the Scheldt in World War II.

See also 
 Ghent–Terneuzen Canal
 Braakman

External links

Canals in Flanders
Canals in West Flanders
Assenede
Knokke-Heist
Canals opened in 1850